Equus may refer to:

 Equus (genus), a genus of animals including horses, donkeys and zebras
 Equus (play), a play by Peter Shaffer
 Equus (film), a film adaptation of the Peter Shaffer play
 Equus (comics), a comic book character; an opponent of Superman
 Equus (magazine), American monthly lifestyle magazine for horse enthusiasts

Music
 "Equus", a composition for concert band by Eric Whitacre
 "Equus", a song by Blonde Redhead from Misery Is a Butterfly
 "Equus", a song by the Cherry Poppin' Daddies off their 1994 album Rapid City Muscle Car

Transportation
Equus Automotive, an American muscle car producer
 Hyundai Equus, Korean automobile model built by Hyundai Motor Company
Vauxhall Equus, 1978 concept car

See also
Eques (ancient Rome), a member of one of the noble classes of Ancient Rome
Equestrian (disambiguation)